Mat Vairo is an American actor, singer, and songwriter. Vairo began his career in 2012 on the stage portraying Melchior Gabor in the musical Spring Awakening.  He has since gone on to star in multiple television series and films.  Vairo made his television series regular debut in The Returned for A+E and Netflix as Simon Moran. He also regularly appeared in the second season of NBCs JJ Abrams and Eric Kripke executive produced series Revolution as Connor Bennett, the son of Sebastian Monroe. He can also be seen in the second season of Netflix and Marvel's Jessica Jones as Stirling Adams, Jessica Jones' first boyfriend.  Other notable credits include Derek Ruvelle in the CW's Jane The Virgin. He is now recurring on The Bold Type as Scott Coleman.

Career
Vairo played Connor Bennett on the NBC series Revolution in 2014. He was a series regular on the A&E television series The Returned in 2015, in the role of Simon Moran. His additional television credits include CSI: Crime Scene Investigation, Switched at Birth and 10 Cloverfield Lane. In 2018, Vairo appeared as Stirling Adams in the episode "AKA I Want Your Cray Cray" of Jessica Jones.

Vairo's theater credits include Spring Awakening and Disney’s Aladdin! A Musical Spectacular.

References

External links
 

American male television actors
Living people
Year of birth missing (living people)